Burtis is a surname. Notable people with the surname include:

 Samuel Burtis Baker (1882–1967), American artist and teacher
 Thomson Burtis (1896–1971), American pulp fiction writer
 Warren Burtis (1848–1911), American baseball umpire

See also
 Kurtis (disambiguation)